Kenneth George "Kenny" McNenny (December 10, 1935 – January 17, 2017) was an American rancher and politician.

He served in the South Dakota House of Representatives from 1987 to 2000 and in the Senate from 2005 to 2008. He also served on the local school board.

References

1935 births
2017 deaths
Republican Party members of the South Dakota House of Representatives
Republican Party South Dakota state senators
School board members in South Dakota
People from Rapid City, South Dakota
Ranchers from South Dakota